Bewitching Attraction (lit. "The Discreet Charm of Female Professors") is a 2006 South Korean black comedy film. The debut film by South Korean director Lee Ha, the plot revolves around a troubled professor (Moon So-ri) and her sexual escapades. The film was released on 16 March 2006, and had a total attendance of 691,735.

Plot
The movie revolves around Eun-sook (Moon So-ri), a lovely but promiscuous professor in a university, who has all the male professors wrapped around her finger. When a popular comic book artist Seok-gyu (Ji Jin-hee) joins the environmental awareness group that she belongs to, he attracts the jealously of Mr. Yoo, a group member who fears that he would steal Eun-sook from him, even though Eun-sook does not return his intense love. What is not known to the rest is that Eun-sook and Seok-gyu attended the same junior high school where they share a secretive tragic history. Back then, Eun-sook was the girlfriend of Seok-gyu's older brother and the three rebellious teenagers indulged in promiscuous sex . Eun-sook worries that her past may be revealed.

Cast 
 Moon So-ri
 Ji Jin-hee
 Park Won-sang
 Yoo Seung-mok as teacher Mr. Yoo.
 Kim Won-joon
 Jo Sung-ha

References

External links

See also
 List of Korean-language films

2006 films
2000s sex comedy films
2000s Korean-language films
South Korean sex comedy films
South Korean black comedy films
2006 directorial debut films
2006 comedy films
2000s South Korean films
Myung Films films